Sain (also Romanized as Sa’īn; also known as Sīmīn) is a village in Arjestan Rural District of Sabalan District, Sareyn County, Ardabil province, Iran. At the 2006 census, its population was 839 in 179 households, when it was in Sareyn District of Ardabil County and before the district's rise to county status. The following census in 2011 counted 979 people in 264 households, by which time the new Sareyn County had been established. The latest census in 2016 showed a population of 947 people in 276 households; it was the largest village in its rural district.

References 

Sareyn County

Towns and villages in Sareyn County

Populated places in Ardabil Province

Populated places in Sareyn County